Douglas Gene Carlston (born April 30, 1947 in Boston, Massachusetts) is the founder and current CEO of Tawala Systems based in San Rafael, California. He was previously CEO, chairman, and co-founder of Broderbund Software, a software publishing firm that produced  Lode Runner, The Print Shop, Where in the World Is Carmen Sandiego?, Prince of Persia, and Myst. Broderbund was acquired in 1998 by The Learning Company (the company previously known as SoftKey) for $420 million, and the combined company was sold to Mattel for $3.6 billion.

Biography
Carlston received his bachelor's degree from Harvard University in 1970 and also studied economics at the Johns Hopkins School of Advanced International Studies. He earned a J.D. from Harvard Law School in 1975.  Prior to founding Broderbund in 1980, he was an attorney.  

As of April 2008, he serves as Chairman of the Board of Directors of Public Radio International (PRI) and of the Carlston Family Foundation (formerly the Broderbund Foundation), and serves on the Boards of the MoveOn Political Action Committee, the Ploughshares Fund, the Albanian American Enterprise Fund, A.H. Belo Corporation, and the Long Now Foundation.  He also serves on the Committee on University Resources of Harvard University, and the Board of Advisors of the Johns Hopkins School of Advanced International Studies.

In March 2014 Carlston donated company records, design documents, and games from Broderbund's history to The National Museum of Play.

References

External links
Biography at the Global Business Network
 

1947 births
Living people
American entertainment industry businesspeople
Harvard Law School alumni
Johns Hopkins University alumni
Businesspeople from Boston
Video game businesspeople